Çınarköy can refer to the following villages in Turkey:

 Çınarköy, Çınar
 Çınarköy, Çüngüş
 Çınarköy, Dursunbey
 Çınarköy, Ezine
 Çınarköy, Kuşadası
 Çınarköy, Yenice